Ichthydium is a genus of gastrotrichs belonging to the family Chaetonotidae.

The species of this genus are found in Europe.

Species:

Ichthydium auritum 
Ichthydium balatonicum 
Ichthydium bifasciale

References

Gastrotricha